Urbain Braems (10 November 1933 – 9 September 2021) was a Belgian football player and manager.

He played for K.S.V. Sottegem, K.R.C. Mechelen, Club Brugge and Daring Club Bruxelles.

He managed Cercle Brugge, Royal Antwerp, Anderlecht, Beveren, Lokeren, Standard de Liège, Panionios G.S.S. and Trabzonspor.

Honours

Manager
Cercle Brugge
Belgian Second Division: 1970–71

Anderlecht
Belgian First Division: 1973–74
Belgian Cup: 1974–75

Beveren
Belgian First Division: 1983–84
Belgian Cup: 1977–78, 1982–83
Belgian Supercup: 1984

Panionios
Balkans Cup runner-up: 1986

Trabzonspor
Turkish Cup: 1991–92

References

External links
 

1933 births
2021 deaths
People from Zottegem
Belgian footballers
Association football forwards
K.R.C. Mechelen players
Club Brugge KV players
R. Daring Club Molenbeek players
Belgian football managers
Belgian expatriate football managers
Cercle Brugge K.S.V. managers
Royal Antwerp F.C. managers
R.S.C. Anderlecht managers
K.S.K. Beveren managers
K.S.C. Lokeren Oost-Vlaanderen managers
Standard Liège managers
Trabzonspor managers
Panionios F.C. managers
Footballers from East Flanders